John Rede (died 1404), of Checkendon, Oxfordshire, was an English politician.

Rede was a Member of the Parliament of England for Oxfordshire constituency in September 1388 and 1391.

References

14th-century births
1404 deaths
People from Oxfordshire
English MPs September 1388
English MPs 1391